Frank C. J. MacDermot (25 November 1886 – 24 June 1975) was an Irish barrister, soldier, politician and historian who served as Senator from 1937 to 1943, after being nominated by the Taoiseach. He served as a Teachta Dála (TD) for the Roscommon constituency from 1932 to 1937. He was also a founding member of Fine Gael.

Early life
MacDermot was born in Dublin, the seventh and youngest son of Hugh Hyacinth O'Rorke MacDermot, Prince of Coolavin. He was educated at Downside School and the University of Oxford and qualified as a barrister. He was commissioned into the Royal Army Service Corps during World War I and ended the war as a Major. He later emigrated to the United States and became a banker in New York City from 1919 until 1927.

Political career

Early political career
He returned to Ireland in the late 1920s, and stood unsuccessfully as an Independent Republican candidate for Belfast West at the 1929 United Kingdom general election. He was elected to Dáil Éireann at the 1932 general election as an Independent TD for Roscommon.

Founding of Fine Gael
In 1933, anticipating another election that year, he founded the National Centre Party alongside James Dillon, and became the party's leader. The party was short-lived; MacDermot led the National Centre Party to merge with Cumann na nGaedheal and the Blueshirts to form Fine Gael that same year, and became a Vice-President of the new party. It was reputedly MacDermot who devised the name of the party.

He was a persistent critic of Fianna Fáil and Éamon de Valera. He criticised the abolition of the oath of allegiance, the abolition of the Free State Seanad Éireann, the abolition of the Governor-General and the introduction of the Constitution of Ireland in 1937, arguing each time that these actions would make partition more secure, and arguing the need for rapprochement with the government of Northern Ireland and the wider unionist community. He continually stated that partition could only be addressed when Dublin-London relationships were normalised.

MacDermot had led the National Centre Party into Fine Gael on the pretense that members of the Irish Republican Army were breaking up meetings of Cumann na nGaedheal and other right-wing parties in support of the Republican Fianna Fáil, and that in order to survive the National Centre Party would have to band together with both Cumann na nGaedheal and Eoin O'Duffy's Blueshirts. However, with the accession of Fianna Fáil to power and tough anti-IRA measure put in place by de Valera, the marriage of convivence rapidly became undone. O'Duffy had become the initial leader of the party but by the summer of 1934 he had become an embarrassment to the other leaders and members of the party when he openly questioned the value of democracy after Fine Gael came second to Fianna Fáil in the 1934 local elections. MacDermot and other constitutionalists in the party rebuked O'Duffy's comments. By September 1934, O'Duffy had resigned as leader and left the party.

O'Duffy's departure did not increase MacDermot's comfort with the big tent of Fine Gael; he resigned from the party in 1935 when members of Fine Gael criticised de Valera for condemning the invasion of Ethiopia by fascist Italy at a meeting of the League of Nations.

Late political career
In 1937, de Valera moved to introduce a new constitution of Ireland, and MacDermot was especially active in the debates over its contents. He objected to the recognition of Irish as the first official language of the state and to the suggestion that the Roman Catholic Church should be given a ‘special position’ in the constitution. He supported direct elections to the Seanad and argued that citizens of Northern Ireland should be allowed to participate in the referendum on the constitution. He also argued that each Dáil constituency should be at least five seats.

He did not seek re-election in 1938. De Valera, surprisingly, appointed him to the re-established Seanad, where he would remain until 1943. He had had personal differences with his Fine Gael colleagues on issues such as the degree of emphasis to be given to Ireland's membership of the Commonwealth. During World War II he was a critic of Irish neutrality throughout his tenure as a Senator, arguing that Ireland should be fighting with the Allies. He subsequently became the U.S. and Paris correspondent for The Irish Times newspaper.

In 1939 MacDermot's biography Theobald Wolfe Tone and His Times was published, which was widely praised and remains the definitive study of his subject.

Personal life
While working in America, MacDermot met the American Elaine Orr Thayer, then the wife of the poet E. E. Cummings, her second marriage. Orr Thayer left Cummings for MacDermot, and at one point, Cummings considered killing MacDermot in revenge. Cummings and Elaine divorced, and subsequently, Frank and Elaine married before engaging Cummings in a protracted custody battle over Elaine's young daughter Nancy. Together Elaine and Frank had one son, Brian MacDermot. Orr Thayer died in 1974. MacDermot died in 1975 while on a visit to London.

References

1886 births
1975 deaths
Independent TDs
National Centre Party (Ireland) TDs
Fine Gael TDs
Fianna Fáil senators
Politicians from County Dublin
Members of the 2nd Seanad
Members of the 3rd Seanad
Members of the 7th Dáil
Members of the 8th Dáil
Irish people of World War I
British Army personnel of World War I
Royal Army Service Corps officers
People educated at Downside School
Irish barristers
MacDermot family
Nominated members of Seanad Éireann
Irish officers in the British Army
Irish expatriates in the United States